The 2022 Asian Taekwondo Championships were the 25th edition of the Asian Taekwondo Championships, and were held from 24 to 27 June 2021 in Hoban Gymnasium, Chuncheon, South Korea.

Medal summary

Men

Women

Medal table

Team ranking

Men

Women

References

External links
WT Asia

Asian Championships
Asian Taekwondo Championships
Asian Taekwondo Championships
Asian Taekwondo Championships, 2022
Asian Taekwondo Championships